Hurtle John Lewis  (2 January 1926 – 22 December 2015) was an Australian Anglican bishop.

Lewis was born in Adelaide, the son of a kangaroo shooter. He was educated at Prince Alfred College and the University of London. After World War II service with the Royal Australian Navy he trained for ordination at St Michael's House, Crafers. He was ordained both deacon and priest in 1951. He then held various positions in the Society of the Sacred Mission until he became Bishop of North Queensland in 1971, a position he held until 1996. He was consecrated a bishop on 2 February 1971 at St John's Cathedral (Brisbane) and retired effective 2 January 1996.

Lewis died on 22 December 2015 in Adelaide.

References 

1926 births
2015 deaths
People from Adelaide
People educated at Prince Alfred College
Alumni of the University of London
Anglican bishops of North Queensland
Members of the Order of Australia